"Starcamp EP" is the 17th single by Japanese singer and voice actress Nana Mizuki. It was released on 6 February 2008. "Starcamp EP" contains the opening theme and ending theme for the anime Rosario to Vampire.

Track listing 
 Astrogation
Lyrics: Hibiki
Composition, arrangement: Jun Suyama
Theme in February for TV program Music Fighter
 COSMIC LOVE
Lyrics: Ryōji Sonoda
Composition, arrangement: Junpei Fujita (Elements Garden)
Opening theme for anime television series Rosario to Vampire.
 Dancing in the velvet moon
Lyrics: Nana Mizuki
Composition: Noriyasu Agematsu  (Elements Garden)
Arrangement: Noriyasu Agematsu  (Elements Garden), Masato Nakayama (Elements Garden)
Ending theme for anime television series Rosario to Vampire.
 
Lyrics: SAYURI
Composition, arrangement: Tsutomu Ohira

Charts

2008 singles
Nana Mizuki songs